Don't Talk may refer to:

Songs
 "Don't Talk", 2001 song by Jon B.
 "Don't Talk (Put Your Head on My Shoulder)", 1966 song by the Beach Boys
 "Don't Talk", 1987 song by 10,000 Maniacs from In My Tribe
 "Don't Talk", 2004 song by Estelle from The 18th Day
 "Don't Talk", 2006 song by Vanessa Hudgens from V
 "Don't Talk", 2017 song by Dune Rats from The Kids Will Know It's Bullshit

Other
 Don't Talk, 1942 film